Northern Colorado Cutthroats are an American soccer team, founded in 2007 by Adam Bauer who is also a Fort Collins Arsenal and Rocky Mountain High School soccer coach. The indoor team is a member of the Premier Arena Soccer League (PASL), the development league for the Professional Arena Soccer League  (PASL-Pro), and plays in the Rocky Mountain Conference against teams from Albuquerque, New Mexico (Albuquerque Asylum), Rio Rancho, New Mexico (New Mexico Banditos), Parker, Colorado (Colorado Predators), Colorado Springs, Colorado (Southern Colorado Stars), Golden, Colorado (Golden Stikers), and Fort Collins, Colorado (F.C. Fury & Diablos S.C.).

They play their home matches at the Arena Sports, LLC in the city of Windsor, Colorado. The indoor team's colors are burgundy and white.

Indoor team

Winter 2007 PASL roster

Summer 2008 PASL roster

Winter 2008 roster

Year-by-year

Playoff record

External links
 Northern Colorado Cutthroats website

Premier Arena Soccer League teams
Soccer clubs in Colorado
Weld County, Colorado
Indoor soccer clubs in the United States
2007 establishments in Colorado
Association football clubs established in 2007